Lazarus A.D. is an American thrash/groove metal band from Kenosha, Wisconsin, originally formed as "Lazarus" in 2005. The "A.D." was added to avoid potential legal issues. They released two studio albums in their career, The Onslaught (2007) and Black Rivers Flow (2011), and despite having never announced an official hiatus or disbandment, the band has been mostly inactive since drummer Ryan Shutler's death in 2015.

History 
In 2007, they released their debut The Onslaught. The band sent the self-released album out to many known metal record labels. The labels turned the band down for a record deal. Later one of the songs off The Onslaught was added to a compilation album by Earache Records. Not long after, the album received positive reviews in metal underground and drew the attention of Metal Blade Records. The band landed a contract with Metal Blade and The Onslaught was re-released in 2009. Lazarus A.D. toured for a year and a half to promote the reissue of The Onslaught, supporting Testament on their Formation of Damnation tour and Kreator on their Hordes of Chaos tour, both in the US. Following this, Lazarus A.D. headlined their own US tour, with support by Lightning Swords of Death. Also during this period, the band shared the stage with three of thrash metal's "big four" (Megadeth, Slayer and Anthrax), as well as other acts like Judas Priest, Rob Zombie, Exodus, Napalm Death and Kataklysm.

Their second studio album, Black Rivers Flow, was released on February 1, 2011, and Lazarus A.D. toured for less than a year to promote the album, first supporting Death Angel on their Relentless Retribution tour in the US, followed by a European co-headlining tour with Bonded by Blood, and then returning to the US by opening for Cavalera Conspiracy. The band's drummer Ryan Shutler died suddenly on May 17, 2015 in Sacramento, California. Although no official hiatus or breakup has been announced, Lazarus A.D. has been mostly inactive since Shutler's death.

Musical style
Lazarus A.D.'s sound has been described as a mix between thrash and groove metal with elements of traditional heavy metal.

Members

Current members
 Jeff Paulick – lead vocals, bass (2005–2015)
 Dan Gapen – lead guitar, vocals (2005–2015)
 Alex Lackner – rhythm guitar (2005–2015)

Former members
 Ryan Shutler – drums (2005–2015; died 2015)

Discography
 Lazarus (demo) (2006)
The Onslaught (2007)
Black Rivers Flow (2011)

References

External links 
 Lazarus A.D. on metalblade.com
 

Musical groups established in 2005
American thrash metal musical groups
Heavy metal musical groups from Wisconsin
Metal Blade Records artists